Oyster Bay may refer to:

Places

Australia
 Oyster Bay, New South Wales, a suburb of Sydney
 Great Oyster Bay, a bay on the east coast of Tasmania

Asia
 Oyster Bay station (MTR), a proposed MTR station on the Tung Chung line in Hong Kong

South Africa
 Oyster Bay, Eastern Cape, a small coastal hamlet and resort

Tanzania
 Oyster Bay, Tanzania, a resort town and suburb of Dar es Salaam

United States
 Oyster Bay (town), New York, a town in Nassau County on Long Island, New York
Oyster Bay Cove, New York, a village within the town of Oyster Bay
 Oyster Bay (hamlet), New York, a hamlet within the town of Oyster Bay
 Oyster Bay (inlet), also Oyster Bay Harbor, an inlet on the north shore of Long Island, New York
 Oyster Bay station, the terminus of the Long Island Rail Road Oyster Bay Branch
 South Oyster Bay, a lagoon off the southern shore of Long Island, New York
 Massapequa, New York, which was called South Oyster Bay until late in the 19th century
 Oyster Bay (Puget Sound), a small bay in Totten Inlet, at the south end of Puget Sound in Washington

Ships 
USS Oyster Bay (AGP-6), a United States Navy motor torpedo boat tender and later seaplane tender

See also